Deep is a 2005 Dutch drama film about the 14-year-old girl Heleen (played by 15-year-old Melody Klaver).

Many scenes are in extreme close-up.

Plot
Heleen practises tongue kissing first on her arm, then on another girl who is her friend, then does it with boys. On holiday in France she likes a French boy Bernard (Hunter Bussemaker). However, when she tells him she loves him, she is uncomfortable with the bold way he starts touching her. Axel (Stijn Koomen) is a childhood friend who is in love with her. However, Heleen is more interested in Axel's English friend Steve (Damien Hope). Heleen is torn between her mother's statement that sex is like eating a sandwich, and Steve's that "sex should be like a voyage to the sublime, without true love no sublime". Steve rejects sex with Heleen.

Encouraged by Steve and Axel, Heleen smokes some cannabis, but she does not really like it. Also her mother Quinta (Monic Hendrickx) encourages her to do it. She also encourages Heleen to give Axel a kiss; after all, they had a fake marriage as young children. Provocatively Heleen gives Axel an elaborate tongue kiss in Quinta's presence.

Quinta asks Heleen not to walk around the house in only underpants: it makes her new lover uncomfortable. Indignantly Heleen shows her little brother her bare breasts and asks whether he is shocked. However, he does not care, he is indifferent to them.

Axel threatens to commit suicide if Heleen refuses to have sex with him. She masturbates him (not fully shown). With the consent of her mother and after getting hormonal contraception drugs, Heleen has intercourse with Axel. She thinks it is okay, not very great, but anyway she is glad to have done it.

External links

https://variety.com/2006/film/reviews/deep-1200513913/https://variety.com/2006/film/reviews/deep-1200513913

2005 films
2005 drama films
Dutch drama films
2000s Dutch-language films